The 2017–18 BBL Cup was the 15th edition of the BBL Cup, the annual cup competition for British basketball teams, organised by the British Basketball League (BBL). The Cheshire Phoenix won its first title. The competition was played from 13 October 2017 until 28 January 2018.

Bracket

See also
2017–18 British Basketball League season
2017–18 BBL Trophy

References

BBL Cup seasons
2017–18 in British basketball